"I'll Always Love You" is a song co-written by William "Mickey" Stevenson and Ivy Jo Hunter and produced by Stevenson and Hunter as a single for The Spinners on the Motown Records label. The single became the Detroit-reared group's first charting single on the Motown Records company since they had signed with the company in 1964 (and their third charting hit over all). The song was a top 40 pop single on the Billboard Hot 100 in the United States, on which it peaked at number 35. On the Billboard R&B singles chart, "I'll Always Love You" peaked at number 8. The song featured lead vocals by the group's main lead singer, Bobby Smith.

Credits
Lead vocals by Bobby Smith
Background vocals by Bobby Smith, Chico Edwards, Pervis Jackson, Henry Fambrough and Billy Henderson
Additional background vocals by The Andantes
Instrumentation by the Funk Brothers

Charts

References

1965 singles
1965 songs
The Spinners (American group) songs
Songs written by William "Mickey" Stevenson
Songs written by Ivy Jo Hunter
Song recordings produced by William "Mickey" Stevenson
Song recordings produced by Ivy Jo Hunter
Motown singles